The 1979 NHL Entry Draft was the 17th NHL Entry Draft. It took place on August 9, 1979, at the Queen Elizabeth Hotel in Montreal, Quebec. The National Hockey League (NHL) teams selected 126 players eligible for entry into professional ranks, in the reverse order of the 1978–79 NHL season and playoff standings. The draft was the first to be conducted after the NHL-WHA merger. As part of the terms of the merger, the four former WHA teams had joined the NHL on the condition that they be placed at the bottom of the draft order, as opposed to the top of the order as is usually the case for expansion teams.

In addition, the minimum draft age was lowered from 20 to 19 with the addition of any underage players who had already played in the WHA. The NHL had been considering lowering the draft age for some time, and timed the decision to lower the draft age at least in part to coincide with the merger. The lowering of the draft age caused two years' worth of draft picks to go in the same draft, resulting in what is generally considered one of the best draft classes in NHL Entry Draft history, which included future Hall of Famers Ray Bourque, Mike Gartner, Michel Goulet and Kevin Lowe in the first round alone. Hall of Famers Mark Messier, Glenn Anderson, and Guy Carbonneau would be drafted in later rounds. 12 of the 21 players selected in the first round would play in at least one All-Star game, 19 of the 21 would play at least 450 career NHL games, and all 21 had NHL careers of at least 235 games.  Under the old rules, Wayne Gretzky and Messier would not have been eligible to enter the NHL until the 1981 draft.

On the other hand, the NHL shortened the draft to only six rounds, whereas some previous drafts ran for more than twenty rounds. As a result, in spite of the larger number of teams participating the 1979 Draft had 108 fewer selections than the previous draft and was the shortest draft since 1971. It is the last Entry Draft to have fewer than 200 selections. Due to the strength of the class and fewer selections, there are many undrafted players who were eligible to be drafted who went on to have notable NHL careers, including Hall of Famer Dino Ciccarelli, five-time Stanley Cup champion Charlie Huddy and four-time 50-goal scorer Tim Kerr.

As consolidation for lowering the minimum age for the draft, the NHL provided junior teams with $40,000 in compensation for each under-age player selected and signed. Under-aged players were also offered back to junior clubs before being able to play in the minor leagues.

Mark Messier was the last active player in the NHL from the 1979 draft class, playing his final NHL game in the 2003–04 season.

Absence of Wayne Gretzky
Rising superstar Wayne Gretzky had played for the Edmonton Oilers in the WHA's final season. As per the terms of the NHL-WHA merger, Gretzky was to have become eligible for the 1979 draft due to having already played professionally in the WHA. However, Gretzky had a personal services contract with Oilers owner Peter Pocklington.

The NHL had originally expected the contract would be voided. But Gretzky, faced with the likelihood of having to play for the struggling Colorado Rockies if he were to enter the draft, refused to void his contract with Pocklington. As a result, a compromise was reached in which the Oilers were allowed to keep Gretzky in exchange for being placed at the bottom of the draft order in the Entry Draft.

Selections by round
Below are listed the selections in the 1979 NHL Entry Draft. Club teams are located in North America unless otherwise noted.

Round one

Notes
 The Los Angeles Kings' first round pick went to the Boston Bruins as the result of a trade on October 9, 1978 that sent Ron Grahame to the Los Angeles Kings in exchange for this pick.
 The Pittsburgh Penguins' first round pick went to the Minnesota North Stars as the result of a trade on October 18, 1978, that sent Dennis Maruk to Washington in exchange for this pick.
Washington previously acquired this pick as the result of a trade on October 17, 1977 that sent Hartland Monahan to the Pittsburgh Penguins in exchange for this pick.
 The Montreal Canadiens' first round pick went to the Los Angeles Kings as the result of a trade on October 5, 1978, that sent the first round pick in 1981 to the Montreal Canadiens in exchange for Murray Wilson and this pick.

Round two

Notes
 The Colorado Rockies' second round pick went to the Philadelphia Flyers as the result of a trade on June 15, 1978, that sent the second round pick in 1978 to the Colorado Rockies in exchange for this pick.
 The St. Louis Blues' second round pick went to the Atlanta Flames as the result of a trade on December 12, 1977, that sent Curt Bennett, Phil Myre, and Barry Gibbs to the St. Louis Blues in exchange for Yves Bélanger, Dick Redmond, Bob MacMillan and this pick.
 The Detroit Red Wings' second round pick went to the Washington Capitals as the result of a trade on August 17, 1977, that sent the rights to Ron Low, the 46th overall pick to the Detroit Red Wings in exchange for Walt McKechnie, the third round pick in 1978 and this pick.
 The Washington Capitals' second round pick went to the New York Islanders as the result of a trade on October 19, 1978, that sent Michel Bergeron to the Washington Capitals in exchange for this pick.
 The Minnesota North Stars' second round pick went to the Montreal Canadiens as the result of a trade on August 9, 1979 that sent Bill Nyrop to the Minnesota North Stars in exchange for the second round pick in 1980 (changed to the second round pick in 1982 on June 11, 1980) and this pick.
 The Toronto Maple Leafs' second round pick went to the Los Angeles Kings as the result of a trade on June 14, 1978, that sent Dave Hutchison and Lorne Stamler to the Toronto Maple Leafs in exchange for Brian Glennie, Kurt Walker, Scott Garland and this pick.
 The Edmonton Oilers' second round pick went to the Minnesota North Stars as the result of a trade on August 9, 1979, that sent Dave Semenko and the 48th overall pick to the Edmonton Oilers in exchange for the 63rd overall pick and this pick.

Round three

Notes
 The Colorado Rockies' third round pick went to the Montreal Canadiens as the result of a trade on November 24, 1976, that sent John Van Boxmeer to the Colorado Rockies in exchange for this pick.
 The St. Louis Blues' third round pick went to the Montreal Canadiens as the result of a trade on August 18, 1977, that sent Jim Roberts to the St. Louis Blues in exchange for this pick.
 The Washington Capitals' third round pick went to the Detroit Red Wings as the result of a trade on August 17, 1977, that sent Walt McKechnie, the third round pick in 1978 and the 24th overall pick to the Washington Capitals in exchange for the rights to Ron Low and this pick.
 The Minnesota North Stars' third round pick went to the Edmonton Oilers as the result of a trade on August 9, 1979, that sent the 42nd overall pick and the 63rd overall pick to the Edmonton Oilers in exchange for Dave Semenko and this pick.
 The New York Rangers' third round pick went to the Buffalo Sabres as the result of a trade on March 12, 1979, that sent Jocelyn Guevremont to the New York Rangers in exchange for the third round pick in 1980 and this pick.
 The Edmonton Oilers' third round pick went to the Minnesota North Stars as the result of a trade on August 9, 1979, that sent Dave Semenko and the 48th overall pick to the Edmonton Oilers in exchange for the 42nd overall pick and this pick.

Round four

Notes
 The Minnesota North Stars' fourth round pick went to the Edmonton Oilers as the result of a trade on June 9, 1979, that the Edmonton Oilers promised to not make Paul Shmyr one of its priority selections in the 1979 NHL Expansion Draft in exchange for this pick.

Round five

Round six

Draftees based on nationality

See also
 1978–79 NHL season
 1979 NHL Expansion Draft
 List of NHL players

Notes

References

External links
 HockeyDraftCentral.com
 1979 NHL Entry Draft player stats at The Internet Hockey Database

National Hockey League Entry Draft
Draft